Eugen Diethelm is a Swiss para-alpine skier. He represented Switzerland at the 1976 Winter Paralympics, at the 1980 Winter Paralympics and at the 1984 Winter Paralympics. In total, he won one gold medal, one silver medal and one bronze medal.

He also competed in the Men's giant slalom for above-knee amputees event at disabled skiing, a demonstration sport at the 1984 Winter Olympics.

Achievements

See also 
 List of Paralympic medalists in alpine skiing

References 

Living people
Year of birth missing (living people)
Place of birth missing (living people)
Paralympic alpine skiers of Switzerland
Alpine skiers at the 1976 Winter Paralympics
Alpine skiers at the 1980 Winter Paralympics
Alpine skiers at the 1984 Winter Paralympics
Medalists at the 1976 Winter Paralympics
Medalists at the 1980 Winter Paralympics
Medalists at the 1984 Winter Paralympics
Paralympic gold medalists for Switzerland
Paralympic silver medalists for Switzerland
Paralympic bronze medalists for Switzerland
Paralympic medalists in alpine skiing
Swiss amputees